Emma ʻAʻima Aʻii Nāwahī (September 28, 1854 – December 28, 1935) was a Native Hawaiian political activist, community leader and newspaper publisher. She and her husband Joseph Nāwahī were leaders in the opposition to the overthrow of the Kingdom of Hawaiʻi and they co-founded Ke Aloha Aina, a Hawaiian language newspaper, which served as an important voice in the resistance to the annexation of Hawaiʻi to the United States. After annexation, she helped establish the Democratic Party of Hawaiʻi and became a supporter of the women's suffrage movement.

Early life 
Born on September 28, 1854, at Kūkūau, a rural part of Hilo on the island of Hawaiʻi, she was regarded as a hapa-pākē, of half-Native Hawaiian and half-Chinese descent. Her mother Kahaoleʻauʻa was the daughter of a minor Hilo chief, while her father Tong Yee was a Chinese immigrant from Xiangshan County, Guangdong. Her father originally left China to take part in the California Gold Rush but later settled in Hilo in 1850 where he became a successful businessman and co-founded Paukaʻa Sugar Plantation with other Chinese sugar planters from lands leased from King Kamehameha V. Her parents married on June 25, 1851. Her father adopted the surname Aʻii (based on the Hawaiian pronunciation of his given name) for himself and his children. She and her four sisters: Aʻana, Aʻlai, Aʻoe, and Mihana were known as Ka Pua O Kina (The Flower of China) and regarded as "famous beauties."

On February 17, 1881, Emma married politician Joseph Nāwahī, in Hilo, as his second wife. They had three sons: Albert Kahiwahiwa Nāwahī (1881–1904), Alexander Kaʻeʻeokalani Nāwahī (1883–1942) and Joseph Nāwahī, Jr. (1885–1888). Through their sons, they have surviving descendants living to this day. They also adopted a daughter named Emmeline Kaleionamoku "Kalei" Nāwahī (1877–1901), who died while attending St. Andrew's Priory School in Honolulu.
During her husband's political career and the couple's residency in Honolulu, Emma became a lady-in-waiting and confidante to Queen Liliʻuokalani.

Political activism

Following the overthrow of the monarchy, on January17, 1893, her husband Joseph Nāwahī became the president of Hui Aloha ʻĀina oNa Kane (Hawaiian Patriotic League for Men), a patriotic group founded shortly after the overthrow to oppose annexation and support the deposed queen. Emma joined the corresponding female organization, the Hui Aloha ʻĀina oNa Wahine (Hawaiian Women's Patriotic League), which was under the leadership of Abigail Kuaihelani Campbell as president. She served one of the member of the executive committee of the organization in 1893 and later served as the Secretary of the Hilo Branch of the League.

In 1893, Emma and the other members of the executive committee of Hui Aloha ʻĀina oNa Wahine submitted a petition to the United States Commissioner James Henderson Blount sent by President Grover Cleveland to investigate the overthrow. The petitions addressed to the government of the United States read:

In December 1894, a search warrant was served on the Nāwahīs' Kapālama home looking for "sundry arms and ammunition." Although nothing was found, Joseph Nāwahī was arrested for treason and bail was set at 10,000 dollars. He spent nearly three months in jail until being bailed out. 
In May 1895, Nāwahī and Emma founded Ke Aloha Aina, a weekly anti-annexationist newspaper written in the Hawaiian language to promote Hawaiian independence and opposition to American annexation.
The paper ran until 1920.

Following his release, Nāwahī's health deteriorated from the tuberculosis he had contracted during his imprisonment. On the recommendation of his doctor to seek a change of climate, they left Hawaiʻi for a trip to San Francisco, California. They left Honolulu aboard the steamer Alameda on August 20, 1896, along with the families of Edward C. MacFarlane and Hermann A. Widemann, both influential royalists and former cabinet ministers of Liliʻuokalani. On September 14, 1896, Nāwahī died of tuberculosis in San Francisco. According to Silva, his last words were to Emma, apologizing for "taking her so far from the ‘äina and from her family and friends, to deal with his death alone in a foreign place". Emma had the remains of her dead husband embalmed and returned to Hawaiʻi for two grand state funerals organized by his supporters, and burial at their home in Hilo.

After Nāwahī's death, Emma became an important political leader in her own right, continuing the legacy of her husband. In 1897, Emma and members of both the male and female branches of Hui Aloha ʻĀina collected over 21,000 signatures by the residents of the Hawaiian Islands opposing an annexation treaty being discussed on the floors of the United States Senate. These Kūʻē Petitions were submitted by a delegation of Native Hawaiians and was used as evidence of the strong resistance of the Hawaiian community to annexation, and the treaty was defeated in the Senate. After the failure of the treaty, Hawaiʻi was instead annexed by the Newlands Resolution, issued in July 1898, shortly after the outbreak of the Spanish–American War.

After annexation, Emma helped organize the Democratic Party of Hawaiʻi in 1899 at the time of the formation of the Territory of Hawaiʻi. In the 1910s, she became a supporter of the women's suffrage movement prior to the passage of the Nineteenth Amendment to the United States Constitution in 1920.

Emma died on December 28, 1935, and was buried at Homelani Memorial Park and Cemetery in Hilo alongside her husband.

References

Bibliography

External links

1854 births
1935 deaths
Native Hawaiian people
Hawaiian Kingdom people
Hawaiian insurgents and supporters
People from Hilo, Hawaii
Editors of Hawaii newspapers
Hawaii Democrats
Hawaiian ladies-in-waiting
Hawaii people of Chinese descent
Women newspaper editors
Hawaii suffragists
Burials at Homelani Memorial Park and Cemetery